The 1979 European Parliament election in Ireland was the Irish component of the 1979 European Parliament election. These were the first direct elections to the European Parliament, and the first election to be held simultaneously across the entire Island of Ireland since the 1921 Irish elections. The election was conducted under the single transferable vote.

Despite the fact the election was held simultaneously across the entire Island of Ireland, Provisional Sinn Féin decided not to contest the election. However, the relative success of Bernadette McAliskey in Northern Ireland helped prompt Sinn Féin to stand in subsequent European elections.

Results

MEPs elected

Voting details

See also
List of members of the European Parliament for Ireland, 1979–84 – List ordered by constituency

References

External links
ElectionsIreland.org – 1979 European Parliament (Ireland) election results

1979 in Irish politics
Ireland
European 1979
European 1979